Herbert James Reeves (1869 – 4 June 1937), also known as James Reeves or Captain Reeves, was an English football pioneer who is regarded as one of the most important figures in the amateur beginnings of football in Catalonia, being noted for his prominent role in promoting football in the city and as the undisputed leader and fundamental head behind the foundations of some of the earliest Catalan clubs in existence such as British Club de Barcelona and Sociedad de Foot-Ball de Barcelona, serving both teams as its captain. In addition to his leadership skills, he also stood out as a great striker, netting some of the very first goals in the history of Catalan football.

Early life
Herbert James Reeves was born in 1869 in Hackney, then a municipality in the county of Middlesex (now a district of Greater London). The exact date of birth is not known, but he was registered in the civil registry between April and June of that year. Reeves was born to a wealthy family, being the second of eight children. He studied engineering, and graduated as an artisan engineer. While in Middlesex, he developed a deep interest in football, already showing great leadership skills from a young age.

At some point in 1892, the 23-year-old Reeves arrived in Barcelona. Work reasons bring him, like many other Britons who moved to the Catalan capital. He was hired by the Barcelona Warterworks Company Ltd and remained in Barcelona for as long as the company lasted (1892–1895). At that time, football was a sport practically unknown in the city. The Barcelona Cricket Club, founded by Britons a year earlier, is the only sign of football in Catalonia, as they played cricket in the summer and then football in the winter (which was common at the time). However, they were a strictly British club, so instead of joining this team, Reeves, an enthusiastic and passionate lover of the game, aimed to create an organization open to everyone, regardless of their origin, a club which would include British and Catalans alike.

Footballing career

1892–93 season

As part of his "waterworks" duty, Reeves becomes a member of Club Regatas de Barcelona, a club of rowing and sailing, where he soon becomes the spokesman for the club's British members (or British Club Regatas). During his time at Club Regatas, he meets and convinces some of the club's Catalan members to play football, along with some French members as well. Reeves then did the same with the Cricket Club, impressing some of his countrymen with his entrepreneurial spirit, thus achieving a respectable number of partners in a short period of time, but despite the British colony of Barcelona having a large presence in the city, finding 22 individuals (plus the referee) was not an easy task, given that the expatriates came to work and many of them had positions of responsibility. Also, Sunday was not a public holiday at the time. It was not until the end of 1892, after months of hard work, that Reeves finally managed to gather enough players to assemble two teams to start practicing football, although in the vast majority of matches they did not complete the 11s per side. This was the birth of a football Society that became known as the British Club de Barcelona (based on La Rambla) of which he was the founder and leader. At last, on 25 December 1892, they were able to play the first known football match in the city (actually in the neighboring municipality of Sants). Very little is known about that Christmas Day in 1892, only that the venue was near the grounds of the Hippodrome of Can Tunis, and that Reeves was the captain of one of the teams. 

Reeves kept organizing football games among members of the British Club de Barcelona, including the infamous match on 12 March 1893 between a blue team captained by Mr. Cochran and a red one led by himself, and Reeves captained by example, netting his side's only goal in a 1–2 loss, with both Blue goals coming from Catalans (Figueras and Barrié), meaning that his club's inclusion of Catalans was paying off. The photograph of these two sides just before the match is widely regarded as the oldest photo of a football team in Spain. Moreover, this game was the catalyst for the first proper chronicle of the dispute of a football match, which appeared in the newspaper La Dinastia on 16 March 1893.

1893–94 season
During the winter of 1893–94, he captained the so-called English colony from Barcelona in a series of matches against the Scottish colony from Sant Martí, which was captained by the Scot Willie Gold. They faced each other at least three times on 8 December 1893, 11 March, and 15 April 1894, however, due to the little statistical rigor that the newspapers had at that time, very little is known about those matches. Local historians claim that this was the first ever 'unofficial' rivalry in Spanish football.

1894–95 season

Despite some encouraging first steps, the British Club de Barcelona, which was never officially established, seems to disappear in the summer of 1894 or changed its name, becoming known as Sociedad de Foot-Ball de Barcelona (Barcelona Football Society) during the 1894–95 season, and with the change of name came also the change of field, leaving the Hippodrome of Can Tunis to settle at the Velódromo de la Bonanova, as Reeves wanted a place of easier access to the city center. Something that did not change, however, was the captain, as Reeves remained the undisputed leader of the entity, captaining one of the sides that disputed the first football match played in Bonanova on 27 January 1895, which was played by 16 players from the Barcelona Football Society divided into two teams (Blues vs Reds). On 2 February, he captained the Blue Team in a match against the Reds led by Beaty Pownall, and once again he led by example, netting his side's only goal in a 1–4 loss, courtesy of Pownall (1) and John Parsons (2). Apart from the Blue v Red games, the Barcelona Football Society only played two matches in the 1894–95 season, both against a team from Torelló (Torelló Foot-ball Association), which was the very first time that teams from two different cities played against each other in Catalonia, and Reeves was the captain in both games. With a capacity of 3,000, Bonanova was seen completely full on both occasions, and he was the first who gave them something to cheer as he netted the opening goal in an 8–3 local win on 24 March 1895. Reeves played several friendly matches at Can Tunis and a few others at Bonanova between 1892 and 1895, where he stood out as a great goal scorer, however, due to the little statistical rigor that the newspapers had at that time, the exact amount of goals he netted is unknown. Despite some encouraging first steps with the Barcelona Football Society, the club was never officially established as Reeves just wanted to play football for fun and was not worried about the official status and legal questions involved in a sport that was still in its infancy in Spain.

1895–96 season
Coinciding with the closure of the Barcelona Waterworks Company Ltd, Reeves returned to the United Kingdom in the autumn of 1895, leaving the club orphaned in its management. Following his departure, it was the Catalans who took the reins of the team, but without him, the entity soon declined, collapsed and around 1896 this society, which was never officially established, seems to disappear. For this reason, no Briton played football in Spain (that we know of) in 1897 and 1898. They only began to play again in 1899, with the emergence of Team Anglès.

Later life
In 1907 he married Katherine Margaret Pownall (1870–1942), widow of Wood (a founder and player of Barcelona Cricket Club) and sister of Pownall (one of the founders of the Barcelona Football Society), and who also played cricket with Barcelona Cricket Club). Katherine already had two children from her previous marriage to Wood, and in 1910 they had a child of their own, John Pownall Reeves.

Reeves died on 4 June 1937 at the age of 68.

References

1869 births
1937 deaths
English footballers
Association football forwards
FC Barcelona players
English expatriate footballers
English expatriate sportspeople in Spain
Expatriate footballers in Spain